Egg London or Egg LDN is an electronic dance music venue and nightclub based in Kings Cross, North London. The venue has historically demonstrated a primary interest in techno and house music, however at present a variety of electronic dance music is regularly featured in addition to those genres. Egg London consists of three levels hosting five rooms: Basement, Main Room, Terrace, Loft and Cell 200. It has a capacity of 900 and is granted a 24-hour licence at weekends. In 2017 Egg London won DJ Magazine's Best of British award for 'Best Large Club'.

History

The club was founded by Laurence Malice and opened in May 2003. Originally a Victorian warehouse, the building was purchased by Malice in 1997, where it was first used as the headquarters for his original brainchild, Trade. The name Egg is a reference to rebirth.

Label

What Came First is a new label dedicated to electronic music which was set up by the people behind Egg London club venue in 2016. What Came First aims to introduce rising new talents as well as working with established artists across a range of musical genres from techno to house and chill-out to alternative.

Events 

Primarily hosting electronic music events, the club frequently books artists under the house and techno genre, both in the club itself and on an international scale. The style of music on a Friday night differs to that of Saturday, with Friday nights targeted at a younger audience, leading to a huge surge in popularity amongst London’s student scene. Friday bookings showcase a more commercial side to house music with the likes of Secondcity, Route 94, Latmun and Detlef frequently playing in the club from 11pm - 6am. Saturdays attract an older audience with techno artists on the bill including Laurent Garnier, Pan-Pot, Matador, Monika Kruse, Sam Paganini, Sven Vath and more until 8am supported by Egg LDN’s in house resident, Kyle E and local London talent including Jozeff and many more.

Charity

Over the years Egg has provided support to many local, national and international charities, the main two being The Father Ray Foundation & Shelter From The Storm. The Father Ray Foundation is located in Pattaya, Thailand, and takes care of 850 orphaned, abused and disadvantage children and students with disabilities. Located locally in Kings Cross, Shelter From The Storm is London’s free homeless shelter, open all year round and funded by donation alone.

Awards 

Egg London won the award for Best Large Club at DJ Mag's Best of British Awards in December 2019. In 2017 it polled the 36th position in that magazine's International Top 100 Club Awards.

See also

Trade (nightclub)
Techno
List of electronic dance music venues

References

External links 
 

Nightclubs in London
Music venues in London
Buildings and structures in the London Borough of Camden
Music venues completed in 2003
2003 establishments in England
Tourist attractions in the London Borough of Camden
Electronic dance music venues